The 1925 World Fencing Championships were held in Ostend, Belgium.

Medal summary

Men's events

References

1925 in Belgian sport
F
World Fencing Championships